Samuel Altshuler (September 16, 1864 – January 13, 1956) was a clothing merchant, mine owner, and industrial developer in the states of Washington and California. He opened and owned clothing stores in Whatcom, Washington (later Bellingham), and his native San Francisco, California, and built several business buildings in both cities. 

In Whatcom, Altshuler took an active role in development of industrial companies into valuable businesses. He helped establish the city's first National Guard division and fire department. He was an active participant in discussions regarding building the Chicago, Milwaukee & St. Paul railroad line through Bellingham. In California, Altshuler owned the Monitor (or Plumas National) mine and the Jackson Gold Mine, and was the secretary of the Plumas Copper King Mines Corporation. 

Altshuler was a member of fraternities, such as the Independent Order of Odd Fellows, the Native Sons of the Golden West, and the Fraternal Order of Eagles.

Early life and family

Samuel Altshuler was born in San Francisco, California, on September 16, 1864. His father, German immigrant Levi Altshuler, moved to New Orleans, Louisiana, and crossed the Great Plains to the Pacific coast in 1852 with the gold diggers. Levi worked as a miner, later turning to work in merchandising and investing into real estate (including the land that was the site of the famous Baldwin Hotel). Samuel's mother, Henrietta Alpern, was also born in Germany, and died in 1887, when Samuel was twenty-three. Levi and Henrietta brought up six children in San Francisco. Samuel's brother Cass joined him in merchandising business, and the third brother, Sol, was a lithographer in San Francisco. They had three sisters– Millie, Ida, and Annette.

Career

Career in Whatcom, Washington
After graduating high school in 1879, Altshuler entered business with his father, who had a clothing store. In 1889, Samuel moved to Whatcom, Washington (later Bellingham), and acquired  of land twelve miles from the city. At the corner of Holly and Canal Streets, he erected a three-story building and opened his own clothing store, which grew into the large and successful business. Later, he erected the two-story Irving building, which was also used for business purposes. During his career as a businessman, Altshuler was interested in industrial companies across the state, and helped many of them expand.

Altshuller helped establish the Whatcom Fire Department. For five years, he served as secretary of the board of fire delegates, and from 1892–1893 served as foreman for Hose Company No. 2.

In 1905, Altshuler was chosen by the Bellingham Chamber of Commerce to be a member of a committee discussing the foundation of a railroad line between Bellingham and Spokane as the Chicago, Milwaukee & St. Paul railroad was considering Bellingham as one of its stop points in the west.

Business in San Francisco

In 1906, Altshuler launched a big sale in his Bellingham store, the Red Front Clothiers, making plans to close it and move his business to San Francisco. In a public letter, he announced that he had bought a lot on Van Ness Avenue in San Francisco, and that construction on his new store had already begun. The store in San Francisco was scheduled to open in July, 1906. Investing $250,000 ($6,600,000 in 2020 dollars) in San Francisco in 1909, Altshuler also purchased other property and planned on erecting other buildings to use in the development of his merchandise business.

Mining business in Greenville, California

After moving to San Francisco, Altshuler also lived in Greenville, California, owning a cabin near the Soda Creek stream, that was later destroyed by fire. There, in 1913, he was an owner of the Monitor (or the Plumas National) mine, which was a rich source of quartz. Altshuler expanded the mines: workers opened up about 900 feet of the old tunnels. By 1921, the Plumas Copper King Mines Corporation was established, and Altshuler served as its secretary. He also owned the Jackson Gold Mine until approximately 1950.

Memberships

In Whatcom (Bellingham), Altshuler was a founding member of the National Guard division, a member of Company M, and a lifetime member of Whatcom Lodge No. 151, F. & A. M. He was a member of the Independent Order of Odd Fellows, the Native Sons of the Golden West, and the Fraternal Order of Eagles.

Personal life and death

On February 21, 1897, Altshuler married Josephine Jacobs, also from San Francisco. She was a daughter of Harriet Jacobs and Henry Jacobs, who worked as a merchant and postmaster in Folsom, California at the time of Lincoln's presidency, and a niece of Junius Jacobs, the U.S. sub-treasurer of San Francisco. The Altshulers had two sons: Henry Irving and Samuel.

Altshuler supported the Republican political party, and was invited to run for elected office multiple times; however, he declined.

As a member of California Kamloops Inc., an organization of fishermen, that held annual gatherings on Shasta Lake, he was called the King of the Kamloopers and the "most worthy member of the order." He attended every convention through 1955. Altshuler died in San Francisco on January 13, 1956, at the age of 91.

See also 
 Baldwin Hotel (San Francisco)
 Independent Order of Odd Fellows
 Native Sons of the Golden West
 Fraternal Order of Eagles

Notes

References

Literature cited

External links 
 Altshuler's brief biography on WikiTree
 Altshuler's mention in the history of the Whatcom Masonic Lodge No. 151

People from San Francisco
Businesspeople from San Francisco
People from Bellingham, Washington
History of Bellingham, Washington
19th-century American merchants
Cloth merchants
American mining businesspeople
1864 births
1956 deaths
Washington (state) Republicans
California Republicans